Melde is a surname. Notable people with the surname include:

 Franz Melde (1832–1901), German physicist
 Josy Melde (born 1951), Luxembourgian footballer
 Kathleen Lowe Melde, American engineer

See also